Fairfield Museum and History Center is a museum and library located at 370 Beach Road in Fairfield, Connecticut.  Established in 2007 by the 103-year-old Fairfield Historical Society, the Fairfield Museum's vision is to use history to strengthen community and to shape its future. The 13,000 square-foot museum features exhibition galleries, a special collection research library and reading room, a family education center, an 80-seat theater overlooking Fairfield's Town Green and a museum shop.

Art and history exhibitions have included the inaugural exhibit Landscape of Change, It’s a Hit! A Hometown View of Our National Pastime, Bravo! A Century of Theatre in Fairfield County, Exploring Our Cultural Heritage, the annual IMAGES juried photography exhibition and Creating Community: Exploring 375 Years of Our Past.  

Programs and activities for families and youth include the Holiday Express Train Show, Family Days, Scavenger Hunts, Vacation Camps, the Halloween Spooky Stroll and walking tours exploring the Town Green campus.

The Meeting Hall overlooking the Town Green hosts lectures, panels and shared discussions led by scholars, university professors and historians that illuminate history through dialogue and debate with the larger community. The Special Collections Library and Reading Room includes genealogy and family papers that date back to 1639. The Museum Shop features a selection of Fairfield gifts and books.

Historic properties
The town of Fairfield owns several historic properties that are managed by the museum.

 The 1750 Ogden House (1520 Bronson Road) – An 18th-century saltbox house with period furnishings.  The museum owns and manages this farmhouse which is open from 1:00-4:00pm on Sundays from June to September.
 Bronson Windmill (2963 Bronson Road) – An 1893 windmill built to supply water to Frederic Bronson’s estate and farm, presently the location of Fairfield Country Day School.
 Burr Homestead (739 Old Post Road) – An 18th century 10-room mansion that is rented out for community and private events.
 Sun Tavern (One Town Hall Green)– A 1780 tavern that was the site of a visit from President George Washington.
 Victorian Cottage and Barn (Two and Three Town Hall Green) – Two “Carpenter Gothic” buildings that served as a gardener's quarters and tool storage. 
 Powder House (230 Unquowa Road) – An 1814 stone structure built to store ammunition in case of British attacks.

References

External links

Fairfield Museum and History Center
Town of Fairfield, Connecticut

Buildings and structures in Fairfield, Connecticut
History centers
History museums in Connecticut
Museums in Fairfield County, Connecticut